Japan Squash Association is the National Organisation for Squash in Japan.

See also
 Japan men's national squash team
 Japan women's national squash team

External links
Official site

Squash
National members of the World Squash Federation
Squash in Japan